Events in the year 1735 in Norway.

Incumbents
Monarch: Christian VI

Events
12 March - The first Holiday Peace Act was introduced.

Undated
Arendal is incorporated as a city through a royal charter.

Arts and literature

Births

Full date unknown
Anders Porsanger, Sami linguist and priest (died 1780)

Deaths